Enzyme Records is a Netherlands-based hardcore record label. Founded in 2001 by Patrick van Kerckhoven as a continuation of Kerckhoven's previous labels, Gangsta Audiovisuals and Supreme Intelligence Records, to 'restart' his labels and continue in a new style of hardcore without being drowned in pointless criticism". All artists that were on the Gangsta Audiovisuals and Supreme Intelligence roster also moved to Enzyme. Releases on Enzyme have been described as gabber, darkcore and industrial hardcore among other genre names.

See also
 List of record labels

External links
 Enzyme Records homepage
 Post relating to the creation of Enzyme Records
 Enzyme Records at Discogs.com

Record labels established in 2001
Dutch record labels
Techno record labels